Thomas Carter (born September 18, 1974) is an American professional wrestler, better known by his ring name Reckless Youth. He has competed in numerous North American independent promotions including the East Coast Wrestling Association, Combat Zone Wrestling and Chikara, where he was one of the original founders alongside Mike Quackenbush. In January 1998, Pro Wrestling Illustrated senior editor Bill Apter called Reckless Youth "one of the most recognizable independent stars" in the United States.

Professional wrestling career

Early career
Carter was part of a small group of "backyard wrestlers", including D'Lo Brown, while growing up in New Jersey. Carter and his friends eventually began renting an actual wrestling ring from Larry Sharpe's Monster Factory. Within a few years, Sharpe eventually offered to book the young men on his shows if they joined his wrestling school and sold tickets for live events. Carter made his pro debut in September 1995. He also trained at Al Snow's Bodyslammers Gym in Lima, Ohio during his rookie year.

Great Lakes Wrestling
Youth made his debut for Great Lakes Wrestling in a ladder match with Steve Nixon. He later started a group alongside "Dirty" Don Montoya and Diamond (later Simon Diamond) called East Coast Invasion. Youth went on to win the GLW World title and competed in the final match in GLW defeating "Dirty" Don Montoya in a two out of three falls match on January 17, 1997.

Combat Zone Wrestling
Youth's first appearance in Combat Zone Wrestling (CZW) was against Justice Pain, at The Staple Gun. He then faced Mike Quackenbush and Ric Blade in a three-way dance at Down In Flames on June 19, 1999. Youth would also have a memorable three-way dance at Un F'N Believable, against Trent Acid and Blade. He then faced Minoru Fujita at the next three shows, all in a losing effort. His final appearance in CZW was a fatal four-way against Nick Berk, Nick Mondo, and Tony Mamaluke in 2003.

Personal life
Youth married his wife Kathy on November 4, 2000; together they had three children. Youth pursued the career of accounting, a side job he worked while on the independents, and is currently the Director of the Tax Department at Jones Apparel.

Championships and accomplishments
American Championship Pro Wrestling
ACPW Light Heavyweight Championship (1 time)
Big Time Wrestling
BTW Light Heavyweight Championship (1 time)
East Coast Wrestling Association
ECWA Mid-Atlantic Heavyweight Champion (1 time)
ECWA Hall of Fame (Class of 2001)
Global Wrestling Alliance
GWA Junior Heavyweight Championship (1 time)
Great Lakes Wrestling
GLW Heavyweight Championship (1 time)
Hardkore Championship Wrestling
HCW Heavyweight Championship (1 time)
HCW Incredible 8 winner (2003)
Independent Wrestling Union
IWU Light Heavyweight Championship (1 time)
International Pro Wrestling
IPW Light Heavyweight Championship (1 time)
IPW Hardcore
IPW Jeff Peterson Memorial Cup winner (2003)
IWA Mid-South
IWA Mid-South Light Heavyweight Champion (1 time)
Jersey All Pro Wrestling
JAPW New Jersey State Championship (1 time)
Jersey Championship Wrestling
JCW Championship (1 time)
Jersey J-Cup winner (2002)
Maryland Championship Wrestling
MCW Cruiserweight Champion (1 time)
MCW Shane Shamrock Memorial Cup winner (2002)
National Wrestling Alliance
NWA North American Heavyweight Champion (2 times)
New Jack City Wrestling
NJCW Light Heavyweight Championship (1 time)
Northern States Wrestling Alliance
NSWA Light Heavyweight Championship (1 time)
Pennsylvania Championship Wrestling
PCW Americas Championship (1 time)
PCW Commonwealth Championship (1 time)
PCW Junior Heavyweight Championship (2 times)
PCW Tag Team Championship (1 time) – with Lance Diamond
Pro Wrestling Illustrated
PWI ranked him 50 of the top 500 singles wrestlers in the PWI 500 in 1998
Steel City Wrestling
SCW Light Heavyweight Championship (1 time)
UWC Heavyweight Championship (1 time)

References

External links

TomCarter.us
Cagematch profile
Online World of Wrestling profile
Internet Wrestling Database profile

American male professional wrestlers
Chikara (professional wrestling)
Living people
People from Memphis, Tennessee
People from Mount Holly, New Jersey
1974 births
NWA North American Heavyweight Champions